Dorzhevo is a rural locality (a village) in Bogolyubovskoye Rural Settlement, Suzdalsky District, Vladimir Oblast, Russia. The population was 10 as of 2010.

Geography 
Dorzhevo is located 45 km southeast of Suzdal (the district's administrative centre) by road. Vyselki is the nearest rural locality.

References 

Rural localities in Suzdalsky District